Arin may refer to:

Geography
 Arin, Armenia, a town in Armenia
 Arin language, an extinct Yeniseic language
 Arin River, a tributary of the Someşul Mare River in Romania
 Ujjain, an Indian city used as the center of ancient and medieval world maps, which was corrupted in Latin as Arin

People
 Arin Gilliland (born 1992), American soccer player
 Arin Hanson (born 1987), American internet personality, voice actor, songwriter, rapper, animator, and cartoonist
 Arın Soğancıoğlu (born 1987), Turkish basketball player
 Arin (singer) (born 1999), South Korean singer
 Suha Arin (1942-2004), Turkish film director, writer, producer and educator

Acronyms
 ARIN, American Registry for Internet Numbers, The American Registry for Internet Numbers (Arin) is the Regional Internet Registry for Canada, the United States, and many Caribbean and North Atlantic islands.

See also
 Arino, a village in Morkinsky District, Mari El Republic, Russia
 Ariño, a municipality located in the province of Teruel, Aragon, Spain
 Aryn (disambiguation)